Lombardy East is a residential suburb of eastern Johannesburg, South Africa. It is located in Region E of the City of Johannesburg Metropolitan Municipality.

History
Originally called the Lombardy Estate, it is named after Lombardy in Italy, a very fertile and productive region of Italy that the landowner M. A. Zoccola wanted to emulate. Zoccola purchased the land in 1893 and consisted of 262 ha.

References

Johannesburg Region E